The Hazara-i-Karlugh were the Turkic soldiers that founded and ruled the Turki Shahi dynasties from 1400 to 1700 and then settled in what is now the current Hazara area of Pakistan.

Etymology
Hazara-i-Karlugh literally means "Hazara of Karlugh origin". Karlugh is a Persian pronunciation of the Turkic word Qarluq.

History
Hazara-i-Karlugh were settled in Northern India (now Hazara, Pakistan) by Timur after his invasion of India in 1398-99

See also
List of Hazara tribes

References

Hazara tribes
Warfare of the Early Modern period
Military history of Pakistan
Turkic peoples of Asia
Nomadic groups in Eurasia